Følling is a village area in the municipality of Steinkjer in Trøndelag county, Norway.  It is located at the southwestern end of the lake Snåsavatnet along the European route E6 highway.  To the south is the village of Vassaunet and the town of Steinkjer, to the west are the villages of Vellamelen and Beitstad, to the northeast is the village of Kvam, and to the southeast are the villages of Sunnan and Binde.  This village is the location of Følling Church.

References

Villages in Trøndelag
Steinkjer